Jamie Hewitt is a former footballer who played as a defender for Chesterfield and Doncaster Rovers.
He was a member of the Chesterfield 1997 FA Cup team that made it to the semi-finals. In the semi-final at Old Trafford, Chesterfield were trailing Premiership Middlesbrough 3–2 in extra time when he headed in a 119th-minute equaliser. Chesterfield however lost the replay 3–0. He is classed as a legend by the Chesterfield fans because of this and also his great career for the club. He later worked at the club as a physiotherapist.

Personal life
His uncle, Ron Hewitt, played in the Football League for Lincoln City in the 1940s.

References

External links

Jamie Hewitt career stats at Post War English & Scottish Football League A - Z Player's Transfer Database

1968 births
Living people
English footballers
Association football defenders
Chesterfield F.C. players
Doncaster Rovers F.C. players
English Football League players
Association football physiotherapists